During the 2018 Winter Olympics Parade of Nations at the 2018 Winter Olympics opening ceremony, beginning at 20:00 KST (UTC+9) on 9 February 2018, athletes bearing the flags of their respective nations led their national delegations as they paraded into the Pyeongchang Olympic Stadium in the host city of Pyeongchang, South Korea. 92 teams qualified to compete (91 nations and Olympic Athletes from Russia).

Background

Athletes entered the stadium in an order dictated by Olympic tradition. As the originator of the Olympics, the Greek team entered first. Other teams entered in alphabetical order based on the names of countries in the Korean language. Following tradition, the delegation from the host nation, South Korea, was scheduled to enter last. However, following solidarity negotiations with North Korea, the host nation was instead represented by the unified Korean delegation, consisting of the South Korean and North Korean teams, marching under the Korean Unification Flag.

The names of the nations were announced in French, followed by English and Korean, the official languages of the Olympic movement and the host nation, in accordance with traditional and International Olympic Committee (IOC) guidelines. Background music included such Korean songs from throughout the ages from as old as the folk song Arirang, to "Short Hair" by Cho Yong-pil and "The Beauty" by Shin Jung Hyun & Yup Juns of the 1970s, and modern K-pop hits such as "Gangnam Style" by Psy, "Likey" by Twice, "Fantastic Baby" by Big Bang, "DNA" by BTS, and "Red Flavor" by Red Velvet.

List
Below is a list of parading countries and their announced flag bearer, in the same order as the parade. This is sortable by country name, flag bearer's name and flag bearer's sport. Names are given in the form officially designated by the IOC.

Notes

References

Parade of Nations
Lists of Olympic flag bearers
Parades in South Korea